Chicocenebra is a genus of sea snails, marine gastropod mollusks in the family Muricidae, the murex snails or rock snails.

Species
Species within the genus Chicocenebra include:

 Chicocenebra gubbi (Reeve, 1849)

References

Ocenebrinae
Monotypic gastropod genera